First Night is a New Year's Eve celebration.

First Night may also refer to:

First Night (TV series), 1963
"First Night" (The Professionals), a 1978 episode of the television series
1st Night, 2010 comedy film
First Night, a minisode in the Doctor Who spin-off Night and the Doctor
"The First Night", 1998 song by Monica
"First Night" (song), song on Survivor's 1984 Vital Signs album
La Primera Noche, 2003 Colombian film, English title The First Night
 The First Night (film), a 1927 American silent film
First Night (film), a 1937 British drama film

Uncapitalized, it may refer to:
Consummation, first night of a marriage in many cultures
Droit du seigneur, supposed right of a lord to brides for the prima nocta
Premiere of a theatrical show, musical composition, film, etc.

See also 

 
First Knight, 1995 film